Luke Smith may refer to:

 Luke Smith (The Sarah Jane Adventures)
 Luke Smith (writer), American writer of Bungie
 Luke Smith (record producer) (born 1978), English record producer of the UK band Clor
 Luke Smith (session musician), British keyboardist
 Luke Smith (tennis) (born 1976), former Australian professional tour tennis player 
 Luke Smith (volleyball) (born 1990), Australian volleyball player
 Luke Smith (rugby union) (born 1971), rugby union player
 Luke Smith (politician), mayor of Logan City, Queensland, Australia (2016–2020)